Chrishall (pronounced Chris hall) is a small village in the English county of Essex. Although in Essex, Chrishall lies close to its borders with Hertfordshire and Cambridgeshire and has a 'Hertfordshire' postcode (SG8).

The village was listed in the Domesday Book as Cristeshalla, or "nook of land dedicated to Christ". In 1422 (1 Henry VI), it appears in a record as "Cristeshale".

The Icknield Way, a Neolithic track, passes through the parish.

Despite its relative isolation the village retains facilities such as a pre-school as well as a primary school. The village also boasts a sports field, a new playground, a church, a village hall and many clubs and societies as well as the Red Cow public house.

Chrishall's population has remained largely unchanged over the last 170 years. In 1841 it totalled 518 and today about 450 people live in the village.

Notable residents include the English composer, John Rutter.

History
Following the Norman Conquest, the area around Chrishall was given to Eustace of Boulogne, who built and occupied a house on a hill to the south of the current church. He named the house "Flanders", and it was there that his daughter Matilda of Boulogne, later wife of King Stephen, was raised. A letter survives that the queen wrote to Hubert the Chamberlain, ordering that the residents of Chrishall be looked after. The house survived until the 15th century, and is believed to have stood on the site of Chiswick Hall, itself built in the 17th century by Sir John James (d.1676).

The village has been home to a church for over a thousand years. Prior to the Norman invasion a small church dedicated to the Virgin Mary was situated on the site of the present church.

The current church was begun in the 12th century. It consists of a nave and aisles, a chancel, and a stone tower containing six bells. It was appropriated, at an early period, to Westminster Abbey.

The church contains a number of monumental brasses, including a notable one in memory of Sir John de la Pole and his wife, dating from 1380.

Chrishall Common

Buildings

The village has a pub, church, primary school, village hall and adventure playground.

The barn attached to The Red Cow public house is the oldest building in Chrishall apart from the church, and is believed to date to 1500. There was once a village shop in front of the pub, however this is now closed.

Holy Trinity Church, a 12th-century Grade I Listed Building, is situated on the edge of the main village. A comprehensive set of images and the detailed history of Holy Trinity appear on the parish website.

In the centre of the village lies Chrishall Holy Trinity and St. Nicholas C of E Primary School, Jigney's meadow and the adventure playground.

The village hall has recently been relocated to the Methodist chapel in Crawley End.

Literature
Chrishall is the presumed location featuring in the short ghost story The Story of a Disappearance and an Appearance by M.R. James, published in A Thin Ghost and Others in 1919. This is an epistolary short story, and the first of its four letters is sent from 'Great Chrishall'.

See also
 The Hundred Parishes

References

External links

  Chrishall Village Archive website
  Parish website
  Parish Council website
  Chrishall School website

Villages in Essex
Uttlesford
Highest points of English counties